Tropical Heat (known as Sweating Bullets in the United States) is a Canadian action series produced in co-operation with Mexico and Israel that aired between April 8, 1991 to October 18, 1993.

The series ran for three seasons totaling 66 episodes. Season one was filmed in Puerto Vallarta, Mexico; due to tax breaks the production was eligible for under the North American Free Trade Agreement (NAFTA). Season two was filmed in Eilat, Israel. Season three was filmed in Pretoria, South Africa, with some sequences shot in Mauritius.  In the United States, it aired as part of the CBS umbrella series Crimetime After Primetime.

Plot
The plot revolves around private investigator, Nick Slaughter, an ex-DEA agent, who after arriving in the fictional resort town of Key Mariah, Florida, and setting up a detective agency there, meets up with local tourist agent, beautiful Sylvie Girard, to solve a variety of different cases.

Cast
Rob Stewart as Nick Slaughter
Carolyn Dunn as Sylvie Girard
John David Bland as Ian Stewart (1991–92)
Ian Tracey as Spider Garvin (1992–93)
Eugene Clark as Ollie Porter  (1991–92)
Pedro Armendáriz Jr. as Lt. Carillo (1991–92)
Ari Sorko-Ram as Sgt. Gregory (1992–93)
Allen Nashman as Rollie (1992–93)
Graeme Campbell as Rupert

Series overview

Popularity in Serbia

The series was particularly popular in Serbia, where it gained cult status. In a tumultuous social environment – with a UN trade embargo imposed on the country and civil war raging nearby – Nick Slaughter's character became a tongue-in-cheek role model, particularly among urban youth, and eventually a symbol of opposition politics.

During the 1990s, the series was broadcast on four Serbian television stations – TV Politika (1992–93), NS+ (1993–94), RTS 3K (1994–95), and RTV Pink (1996–97) – and rerun numerous times. Aside from its dry humor and exciting plot, the show was extremely well received because its idyllic tropical island atmosphere was an absolute contrast to mid-1990s Serbia. The reruns in the then-isolated country made the show immensely popular, turning it into a minor national cultural phenomenon.

The notion of Nick Slaughter being a widely received hero in Serbia probably began in the Belgrade suburb of Žarkovo where, now-legendary, graffiti "Sloteru Niče, Žarkovo ti kliče" ("Nick Slaughter, Žarkovo hails you", which rhymes in Serbian) appeared. Soon afterward during the massive months-long protests throughout winter 1996–97 against the alleged election fraud perpetrated by Slobodan Milošević and his party at the November 1996 local elections, the slogan "Slotera Nika, za predsednika" ("Nick Slaughter for President", also rhymes in Serbian) became popular on banners and badges as a symbol of opposition to the regime. Another popular slogan was "Svakoj majci treba da je dika, koja ima sina k'o Slotera Nika" ("Every mother should be proud to have a son like Nick Slaughter"). Serbian punk band Atheist Rap paid a tribute to the series' protagonist in the song "Slaughteru Nietzsche" with its graffiti-based chorus "Sloteru Niče, Srbija ti kliče" ("Nick Slaughter, Serbia hails you") on their 1998 album II liga zapad. In 2008, Rob Stewart performed the song with the band on stage.

Many local bars, taverns, and summer patios in Serbia were (re)named Tropical Heat in honour of Nick Slaughter and the popular TV show. They were usually located along the rivers, to resemble "The Key Mariah Spirit".

Apparently, no one associated with the show was aware of its extraordinary popularity in Serbia until December 2008 when Canadian actor Rob Stewart who played Nick Slaughter in the series accidentally discovered it by stumbling upon a Facebook fan group named "Tropical Heat/Nick Slaughter" with some 17,000 (mostly Serbian) followers. After familiarizing himself with the cause and the circumstances of his Serbian fame, the mostly unemployed 48-year-old Stewart, along with a filmmaker friend Marc Vespi and his sister Liza, decided to attempt to make Slaughter Nick for President, a documentary about it. To that end, they contacted the band Atheist Rap and it was soon arranged for Rob to appear on stage as their guest at the To Be Punk Festival in Novi Sad on June 6.

By late March 2009 the news was leaked to Serbian press and several media outlets carried items that Rob Stewart would be coming to Serbia in May or early June as guest of Atheist Rap in order to film a documentary on his character's popularity in the country during the 1990s. Stewart and his partners contacted Srđa Popović, former activist of Otpor!, the Serbian student movement that played a significant role in eventually bringing down Milošević. On June 3, 2009, Stewart arrived in Belgrade to a hero's welcome with enormous media attention afforded to his visit. With Atheist Rap and Popović as their hosts and guides through Serbia, and in between the documentary shooting schedule, Stewart made the media rounds, appearing on talk shows (Piramida and Fajront Republika), giving interviews, and making public appearances such as planting of the maple trees in Žarkovo with John Morrison, Canadian ambassador to Serbia.

Stewart believed that the popularity of the show was due to its portrayal of Nick Slaughter as a bumbling idiot. Despite his flaws,  Slaughter was however brave, honest and caring. Stewart noted that the Serbs have a very "self-deprecating" sense of humor, so Slaughter's bumbling idiot qualities appealed to them. Stewart also noted during his visit to Serbia that he was told by countless people that they loved the character because of his indomitable qualities and his refusal to give up, which matches with the Serb self-image.

As a result of their June 2009 stay in Belgrade and Novi Sad, a six-minute documentary promo was put together and entered in the Roma Fiction Fest in Rome, Italy on July 8, 2009 under the "work in progress" section.

Movie sequel
Two episodes of the show were re-edited into a feature-length film, Criss Cross. IMDb states this received a release in 2001.

Home media
Tango Entertainment released the complete series on DVD on January 8, 2008 in a 9-disc set entitled Tropical Heat: Sweating Bullets Complete series.

On March 16, 2021, Mill Creek Entertainment will release Tropical Heat- The Complete Series on DVD in Region 1.

See also

References

External links 
 
 Unofficial fan page
 Slovenian page about Tropical Heat

1990s Canadian crime drama television series
1991 Canadian television series debuts
1993 Canadian television series endings
CBS original programming
English-language television shows
Television shows set in Florida
Television shows filmed in Mexico
Television shows set in Israel
Television shows filmed in South Africa
Television shows filmed in Israel
Television shows filmed in Mauritius